Wila Salla (Aymara wila red, salla rocks, cliffs, "red rocks") is a  mountain in the Andes of Bolivia. It is located in the Oruro Department, Eduardo Abaroa Province, Challapata Municipality. It lies southeast of Wila Qullu and Wila Quta.

References 

Mountains of Oruro Department